Oligodactyly (from Ancient Greek oligos 'few' and δάκτυλος daktylos 'finger') is the presence of fewer than five fingers or toes on a hand or foot.

It is quite often incorrectly called hypodactyly; the Greek prefixes hypo- and hyper- are used for continuous scales (e.g. in hypoglycaemia and hyperthermia), as opposed to discrete or countable scales, where oligo- and poly- should be used (e.g. in oligarchy and polygamy). Oligodactyly is therefore the opposite of polydactyly. Very rare, this medical condition usually has a genetic or familial cause.

Oligodactyly is sometimes a sign or symptom of several syndromes including Poland syndrome and Weyer Ulnar Ray Syndrome. It is a type of dysmelia.

Ectrodactyly is an extreme instance of oligodactyly, involving the absence of one or more central digits of the hand or foot and is also known as split hand/split foot malformation (SHFM). The hands and feet of people with ectrodactyly are often described as "claw-like" and may include only the thumb and one finger (usually either the little finger, ring finger, or a syndactyly of the two) with similar abnormalities of the feet.

People with oligodactyly often have full use of the remaining digits and adapt well to their condition. They are not greatly hindered in their daily activities, if at all. Even those with the most extreme forms are known to engage in tasks that require fine control, such as writing and bootmaking as well as working as a cab driver.

The Wadoma people of Zimbabwe have a high frequency of oligodactyly.

References

External links 
 NIH website page on Oligodactyly

Congenital disorders of musculoskeletal system
Rare diseases